Sir George William Lefevre M.D. (1798 – 12 February 1846) was an English physician and travel writer.

Life
Lefevre was born at Berkhampstead, Hertfordshire. After apprenticeship to a local practitioner of medicine in Shropshire, he studied medicine at the university of Edinburgh, and at Guy's and St. Thomas's Hospitals in London, and graduated M.D. at the university of Aberdeen, 4 August 1819. He was vulnerable to pulmonary disease, and on the advice of Pelham Warren decided to go abroad. After vain attempts to obtain an Indian appointment, he went to Pau with a patient, Thomas Douglas, 5th Earl of Selkirk, who died there of phthisis.

Lefevre then returned to England and tried to get into practice. He was admitted a licentiate of the College of Physicians of London 1 April 1822. Having failed in a candidature as physician to a dispensary, he decided to go abroad again, and, through the influence of Benjamin Travers, became physician to a Polish nobleman, with whom he travelled for nine years, five in France and the rest in Austria, Poland, and Russia. He finally left the post at Odessa and went to St. Petersburg, where he began in private practice, and became physician to the British Embassy. In 1831 he was appointed to the charge of a district during the cholera epidemic.

In 1832 Lefevre was in England for a short time, but returned to Russia, and was shortly knighted by patent as a reward for his services to the embassy. He settled in London in 1842, and was admitted a fellow of the College of Physicians, 30 September. He resided in Brook Street, Grosvenor Square, and in 1845 delivered the Lumleian lectures at the College of Physicians. He suffered from depression, and on 12 February 1846 committed suicide by swallowing prussic acid, at the house of his friend Dr. Nathaniel Grant in Thayer Street, Manchester Square.

Works
Lefevre published, in London, Observations on the Nature and Treatment of the Cholera Morbus now prevailing epidemically in St. Petersburg. Experience led him to oppose the indiscriminate use of calomel and opium in the treatment of cholera, to favour the use of purgatives, and to avoid that of astringents. In 1843 he published The Life of a Travelling Physician in 3 vols. It is an account of his travels, and is mainly known for its description of social life in Poland and at the English factory at St. Petersburg. It was published without his name, but was acknowledged later. In the same year he published Advantages of Thermal Comfort (enlarged edition 1844). It is a short treatise on the temperature of rooms, clothing, and bedmaking, suggested by his Russian experience of a severe climate. In 1844 he published An Apology for the Nerves, or their Influence and Importance in Health and Disease, a collection of medical notes including one on plica polonica.

Notes

 
Attribution
 

1798 births
1846 deaths
19th-century English medical doctors
English medical writers
English travel writers
Suicides by poison
Suicides in Westminster
Burials at Kensal Green Cemetery
English memoirists
1840s suicides
Alumni of the University of Aberdeen
Alumni of the University of Edinburgh